Cyphostemma bainesii is a species of tree native to Namibia in Southern Africa. It grows up to 1 m (3 ft) in height, with green leaves up to 27 centimeters long by 11 wide.  Mildly poisonous.

References

 
 

bainesii
Trees of Africa